The CIBC National Cricket League, formerly known as the Scotiabank National T20 Championship is the first ever Twenty20 domestic competition in Canada held by Cricket Canada. The first tournament started in 2005 from August 1 to 5, in Vancouver, British Columbia at the Brockton Oval. It featured teams from British Columbia, Alberta, Manitoba, Quebec and Ontario. It saw British Columbia defeated Ontario in the final, by four wickets.

In 2008, it was revived and was played at the Maple Leaf Cricket Club in King City, Ontario, it was held on a rotational basis, this year the Ontario Cricket Association hosted teams from Alberta, British Columbia, Manitoba, Ontario, Quebec, Saskatchewan and the Nova Scotia. Ontario 'B' were champions defeating Quebec in the final.

However, in 2012 Cricket Canada revamped the tournament and modeled it after the Indian Premier League. Instead of each province sending their own representative teams, Cricket Canada divided the country into 5 regions, with a team composed of players from a particular region on the team. In addition, each region was assigned a member of the Canada national cricket team to serve as captain. Other Canadian national team players at both the Senior and Under 19 levels competed for regional teams as well. Also, in 2013, Cricket Canada brought in 5 professional cricketers from Trinidad and Tobago to improve the play of the competition.

In addition to the T20 tournament, this competition also features a 50 over tournament featuring the same squads. The Cliff Cox Trophy is awarded to the 50 overs winner, while the Calvin Clarke Trophy is awarded to the T20 winner. Under the Scotiabank sponsorship, the winner received the Ed Bracht Trophy.

Teams

Former Teams
Ontario
National Capital Region (Canada), OR Ontario B
British Columbia
Alberta
Nova Scotia
Quebec
Manitoba
Saskatchewan
New Brunswick
Prince Edward Island
Prairies
Eastern Canada

Championships
The Western Stallions are the reigning National Cricket League champions winning both formats in 2013.

Sponsorship
CIBC (A Canadian chartered bank) became the title sponsor for the competition in 2013. As well each of the clubs have sponsors of their own. The Pacific Edge was sponsored by Vij's at Home, the Western Stallions by Titan GSG Media Corporation, Prairie Fire by CricHQ, Central Shield by Sportsnet World and Eastern Fury by Teacher's Blended Scotch Whisky.

Television
In 2013, matches were executive produced by TITAN GSG MEDIA CORPORATION and produced by Rogers Television.  Broadcast coverage was provided in High Definition on Rogers Television and Sportsnet World. As well, all matches were streamed on www.sportsnet.ca.  The commentary team included Nigel Reed, known for Canadian soccer and rugby coverage on TSN and Sportsnet, and Faraz Sarwat, notable Cricinfo, Wisden and Toronto Star journalist.

See also
 Cricket Canada
 Canada national cricket team
 Sport in Canada
 Canadian women's cricket team

References

External links
 Official webpage

Professional sports leagues in Canada
Recurring sporting events established in 2008
Twenty20 cricket leagues
Canadian domestic cricket competitions
Defunct cricket leagues